Gmina Sławno is a rural gmina (administrative district) in Opoczno County, Łódź Voivodeship, in central Poland.

The gmina contains part of the protected area called Spała Landscape Park.

Villages
Gmina Sławno contains the villages and settlements of Antoninów, Antoniówka, Bratków, Celestynów, Dąbrowa, Dąbrówka, Gawrony, Grążowice, Grudzeń-Kolonia, Grudzeń-Las, Józefów, Kamień, Kamilówka, Kozenin, Kunice, Ludwinów, Olszewice, Olszowiec, Ostrożna, Owadów, Popławy, Prymusowa Wola, Psary, Sepno-Radonia, Sławno, Sławno-Kolonia, Szadkowice, Tomaszówek, Trojanów, Unewel, Wincentynów, Wygnanów, Zachorzów and Zachorzów-Kolonia.

Neighbouring gminas
Gmina Sławno is bordered by the gminas of Białaczów, Inowłódz, Mniszków, Opoczno, Paradyż and Tomaszów Mazowiecki.

References
Polish official population figures 2006

Slawno
Opoczno County

de:Sławno#Gmina Sławno